Gregory A. "Truck" Tebbutt (May 11, 1957 – December 17, 2021) was a Canadian professional ice hockey player with the Quebec Nordiques and Pittsburgh Penguins of the National Hockey League (NHL) in the 1980s. A defenceman, he was a rugged enforcer in his own end who also put up solid offensive numbers in junior and the minors.

Life and playing career
Born in North Vancouver, British Columbia, Tebbutt played junior with the Victoria Cougars, Flin Flon Bombers and Regina Pats in the WCJHL, from 1975 to 1978. He was drafted 130th overall by the Minnesota North Stars in 1977. After scoring 28 goals for the Flin Flon Bombers in 1977-78, Tebbutt split the next year between the Binghamton Dusters and the World Hockey Association (WHA) Birmingham Bulls.

Following the WHA/NHL merger, Tebbutt was claimed on waivers by the Nordiques. Apart from his two-game stint in the NHL he was a solid minor leaguer for the next four years and topped the 20-goal mark twice. In July 1983, Tebbutt signed with Pittsburgh and played 24 games in the 1983–84 season. Following this he returned to the minors before retiring. During the mid-1980s he reached the 200 penalty minute mark and scored 20 goals in three straight seasons in the IHL. Tebbutt's last season was in 1987–88 with the Baltimore Skipjacks of the AHL. He died on December 17, 2021, at the age of 64.

Career statistics

References

External links
 

1957 births
2021 deaths
Baltimore Skipjacks players
Birmingham Bulls draft picks
Birmingham Bulls players
Canadian expatriate ice hockey players in the United States
Canadian ice hockey defencemen
Flin Flon Bombers players
Ice hockey people from British Columbia
Minnesota North Stars draft picks
Muskegon Lumberjacks players
People from North Vancouver
Pittsburgh Penguins players
Quebec Nordiques players
Regina Pats players
Victoria Cougars (WHL) players